Inäl Qaγan was the third khagan of Second Turkic Khaganate.

During Qapγan's reign 
He actively participated in his father's campaigns. He became lesser khagan and received from his father 40,000 troops of the western wing, so the Chinese called him Tuoxi Kehan (拓西可汗, literally the expander of the west) in 699.

He took part in battles involving Muslim conquest of Transoxiana between 711-712. He was also present in Siege of Beiting, where his brother Toŋa Tegin was killed in 714.

Reign 
He was killed by Kul Tigin during struggle for the throne. Some writers say that the law of succession was that power passed from a ruler to his younger brothers before returning to his sons. Thus the order was Ilterish Qaghan, his brother Qapaghan Qaghan, then his sons Bilge Qaghan and Kul Tegin. Inäl, being Qapγan's son, had no right on the throne. Other writers treat the matter as a coup d'état with no mention of the rules of succession. Inel and his supporters was killed by Kul Tigin.

In popular culture
 Portrayed by Lee Yeong-ho in 2006–2007 KBS TV series Dae Jo Yeong.

References 

Göktürk khagans
Ashina house of the Turkic Empire
8th-century Turkic people
Leaders ousted by a coup
Tengrist monarchs
8th-century murdered monarchs